Korea has historically suffered several floods due to heavy rains, typhoons, and heavy snowfalls. Most of the flood damage was caused by storms and tsunamis caused by typhoons, and floods.

1980s 

 In 1987, floods caused by Typhoon Thelma killed 123 people and caused $272 million in damages.

2000s 

 In 2002, Typhoon Rusa caused mass flooding across Korea.

2010s 

 The 2011 Seoul floods killed 69 people and caused hundreds of millions of damage.

2020s 

 From late June to mid-August 2020, heavy rains fell intensively or locally across the Korean Peninsula, causing a lot of damage.
 On August 8, 2022, 100-300 mm of heavy rain per day fell in the metropolitan area.

References

See also 
 North Korea flooding (disambiguation)

Natural disasters in North Korea
Natural disasters in South Korea
Floods in North Korea
Floods in South Korea
Events in Korea